Super Roots 8 is the 7th installment in the Super Roots EP series by noise rock band Boredoms, released in 1999 by Warner Music Japan.

The three tracks are all variations on
"Jungle Taitei," the theme song to a Japanese children's show. It was written by Tsuyoshi Ishigouka and Isao Tomita.

Track listing
"Jungle Taitei" – 3:46
"Jungle Taitei (DJ Let's TRY & D.I.Y. - Drum Machine Mix)" (remixed by Eye) – 2:41
"Jungle Taitei (Laughter Robot's Hemp Mix)" (remixed by Yann Tomita) – 7:49

Personnel
Yamantaka Eye – mixing, vocals, ring chime
Seiichi Yamamoto – guitar, percussion
Hilah – bass guitar, percussion, vocals
Yoshimi P-We – vocals, drums, djembe, keyboard
ATR – djembe
Eda – djembe

References

Boredoms EPs
1999 EPs